Parabacteroides gordonii  is a Gram-negative, non-spore-forming, rod-shaped and non-motile bacterium from the genus of Parabacteroides which has been isolated from human blood.

References 

Bacteroidia
Bacteria described in 2009